Michał Głogowski (born May 25, 1984) is a Polish welterweight kickboxer fighting out of Siedlce for TKKF Siedlce.  He is the WKN Low Kick World Champion and the K-1 Europe MAX 2008 in Poland runner up.

Amateur career

Michal won his first amateur international competition representing Poland at the W.A.K.O. European Championships 2004 in Budva, Montenegro.  He defeated all three of his opponents at the championship by decision to take the gold medal in the 71 kg Low Kick rules category.  The following year he entered the W.A.K.O. World Cup 2005 held in Piacenza, Italy.  Michal won a silver medal at this event, finishing runner up against compatriot Ziemnicki Przemyslaw in the final of the Light Contact 69 kg category.  He also won a silver medal in Low-Kick at the world championships in Agadir, Morocco later on in the year.

Over the next couple of years Michal would have mixed successes on the amateur circuit, suffering the disappointment of a semi final exit (and bronze medal) at the 2006 W.A.K.O.  European Championships in Skopje, Macedonia.  In 2007 Michal won a silver medal at World Championships 2007 in Belgrade, Serbia, later bettering it at the European Championships 2008 held in Porto, Portugal by winning gold.  This would likely be his last amateur competition as he was increasingly becoming involved on the professional circuit.

Professional career

Michal would become professional in 2006.  That year he became a world champion by winning the World Kickboxing Network (W.K.N.) Low Kick World title.  In 2007 he made his K-1 MAX debut at the K-1 East Europe MAX 2007 held in Vilnius, Lithuania, defeating his opponent the Azerbaijani fighter Agiliar Navruzov by majority decision in a reserve match. 
 
2008 would be a productive year for Michal.  At the start of the year he defeated the Portuguese fighter Joao Balbeira in his hometown of Siedlce, Poland  to win the W.A.K.O. Pro Intercontinental title.  In March he was invited back to fight in K-1 MAX at the K-1 Europe MAX 2008 in Poland which was to be held at Warsaw.  Michal managed to make the final but was defeated by Muay Thai fighter Petr Nakonechnyi.  By the end of the year he reached another final at the TK2 World MAX 2008 in Aix en Provence, France only to denied a decision by the judges.

In 2009 Michal came back from training in Thailand to defeat Norbert Balogh at the K-1 World Grand Prix 2009 in Łódź by an impressive knockout.  He would return to K-1 MAX the following year at the K-1 World Grand Prix 2010 in Warsaw where he faced former ZST Grand Prix champion and knockout specialist Remigijus Morkevičius.  After three hard fought rounds the judges scored the fight a draw, despite many in the crowd thinking that Michal had edged it.  As a result of his performances in K-1 MAX, Michal was granted a wildcard slot at the forthcoming K-1 World MAX 2010 Final 16 and managed to qualify for the K-1 World MAX 2010 Final where he lost to eventual finalist Yoshihiro Sato at the quarter final stage.

Titles
Professional:
2008 TK2 World MAX Runner Up -70 kg
2008 K-1 Europe MAX in Poland Runner Up
2008 W.A.K.O. Pro Intercontinental Champion -69 kg
2006 World Kickboxing Network Low Kick World Champion
Amateur:
2008 W.A.K.O. European Championships in Guimarães, Portugal  -71 kg (Low-Kick)
2007 W.A.K.O. World Championships in Belgrade, Serbia  -71 kg (Low-Kick)
2006 W.A.K.O. European Championships in Skopje, Macedonia  -71 kg (Low-Kick)
2005 W.A.K.O. World Championships in Agadir, Morocco  -71 kg (Low-Kick) 
2005 W.A.K.O. World Cup in Piacenza, Italy  -69 kg (Light-Contact)
2004 W.A.K.O. European Championships in Budva, Serbia and Montenegro  -71 kg (Low-Kick)
x14 Poland National Kickboxing Champion

Professional kickboxing record

Amateur kickboxing record

See also
List of K-1 events
List of K-1 champions
List of male kickboxers

References

External links
Michal Glogowska Profile (Lithuanian Language Website)

Polish male kickboxers
Welterweight kickboxers
Polish Muay Thai practitioners
People from Siedlce
1984 births
Living people
Sportspeople from Masovian Voivodeship